Mikhail Petrovich Frinovsky (7 February 1898 – 4 February 1940) served as a deputy head of the NKVD in the years of the Great Purge and, along with Nikolai Yezhov, was responsible for setting in motion the Great Purge.

Biography
Mikhail Petrovich Frinovsky was born in 1898 to a teacher in the village of Narovchat in the Penza Governorate of the Russian Empire. He was of Russian ethnicity. Prior to World War I, he studied in a religious Orthodox school. In January 1916, Frinovsky volunteered for the army. He served as a sergeant in the cavalry until his desertion in August the same year. He joined an anarchist group and took part in assassination of Major-General M. A Bem in 1917.

In March 1917, Frinovsky began working as an accountant in Moscow. In September, he volunteered for the Red Guard. The unit under his command participated in storming of the Kremlin, during which Frinovsky was severely wounded.

Between March and July 1918, Frinovsky again returned to civilian life and worked as a deputy administrator of the Hodynskaya Clinic. In July 1918, he joined the Russian Communist Party (b) and volunteered for the Red Army. Frinovsky was made a commissar of a combat unit and also head of the Special Section (the political supervisor and representative of the secret police, ChK) of the 1st Cavalry Army.

In 1919, Frinovsky was transferred to the VChK. Later in the year, he became a deputy of the Special Section for the Moscow ChK. In this capacity, he participated in many operations most vital for survival of the Bolshevik regime, including actions against anarchists, as well as destruction of anarchist and rebel militias in the Ukraine.

From December 1919 until April 1920, Frinovsky served in the Special Section for the Southern Front. In 1920, he was transferred to the South-Western Front, where he served as chief of the Special Section, and as deputy to the Chief of the Special Section of the 1st Cavalry Army. Between 1921–1922, he was the deputy to the Chief of the Ukrainian ChK.

From 1922 to 1923, Frinovsky headed the administrative division of the Kiev GPU. From 23 June he was also head of the OGPU of the South-East.

In November 1923, Mikhail Frinovsky was transferred to the Northern Caucasus and given command of the Special Section for the region. In January 1926, he became head of GPU forces.

In July 1927, Frinovsky was again transferred to Moscow, this time as aide to the commander of the Special Section for the region. In 1927, he completed high-command courses at the Frunze Military Academy. From 28 November 1928 until 1 September 1930 he served as the commissar of the Special Forces division assigned to the Dzerjinsky College of the OGPU USSR.

On 1 September 1930 Mikhail Frinovsky was promoted and made chairman of the GPU of Azerbaijan. In April 1933, he was again promoted and became the commander of OGPU Border Guard. On 10 July 1934 Frinovsky became head of Border and Internal Troops for the NKVD.

Great Purges
Frinovsky was one of the major beneficiaries of the first purge of the NKVD that followed dismissal of its head, Genrikh Yagoda. He had had some kind of falling out with Yagoda, but was on good terms with Nikolai Yezhov, Yagoda's successor. On 16 October 1936 Frinovsky was appointed Deputy Chairman of the NKVD, which made him third in seniority within the security apparatus at the start of the great purge. On 15 April 1937 he was promoted First Deputy Chairman of the NKVD, and head of the Chief Directorate of State Security. Now second in command to Yezhov, he was in charge of the interrogation of Yagoda, in which Stalin took a personal interest. He was jointly responsible with Yezhov for setting the quotas of arrests that were required in each part of the Soviet Union, and in drawing up the 383 lists submitted for Stalin's approval, containing 44,000 names of people who were to be arrested, of whom 39,000 were to be executed.

He led the squad of senior NKVD officers who descended on Kiev on 7 June 1937 to facilitate arrest of the recently dismissed head of the Ukraine NKVD, Vsevolod Balitsky, and of Red Army officers suspected of being too closely linked to their former commander, Iona Yakir. On 17 February 1938 he supervised the murder of the head of the NKVD Foreign Department, Abram Slutsky, who was chloroformed and injected with lethal poison in Frinovsky's office. On 28 April 1938 he signed the warrant for the second arrest of the poet Osip Mandelstam, who died in the gulag. On 17 June 1938 he arrived in Khabarovsk, in the Far East, in a special train carrying a large contingent of NKVD officers, to supervise mass arrests of military and security personnel in the Far East, including 16 senior NKVD officials, who were shot, and the commander of the Far Eastern Army, Marshal of the Soviet Union Vasily Blyukher.

While Frinovsky was in the Far East, Stalin proposed that he be appointed People's Commissar for the Navy, an apparent promotion, which was actually part of a manoeuvre to remove Yezhov. On 22 August 1938 it was announced that his replacement as First Deputy Chairman of the NKVD would be Lavrenti Beria. Frinovsky arrived back in Moscow on 25 August and for a few days he effectively ran  the NKVD, while Beria was in Georgia arranging who would take over from him there and Yezhov was in a state of drunken depression. He seized the opportunity to have a group of former NKVD officers, including Leonid Zakovsky and Sergei Naumovich Mironov, shot, to prevent them giving evidence against him to Beria.

On 8 September 1938 he was named People's Commissar for the Navy, and was sufficiently in favour to be among the guests at a lunch in the Kremlin on the 21st anniversary of the Bolshevik revolution, at which Stalin and Beria were present, but Yezhov was excluded, but at the party congress in March 1939, he was not elected to the Central Committee, when one of his nominal juniors was. He wrote to Stalin on March 16, pleading to be dismissed because he knew nothing about running a navy, but he was in office, at least nominally, until his arrest on 6 April 1939.

On 12 April his wife, Nina, and son, Oleg, were also arrested. All three were included in a list of 346 people Beria submitted to Stalin on 16 January 1940, with a recommendation that they all be shot. Yezhov and the writer Isaac Babel were on the same death list. Oleg Frinovsky, who was 17, was executed on 21 January and Nina Frinovskaya on 3 February. It was standard procedure that the condemned were photographed prior to execution: the last pictures of Frinovsky's wife and son are in David King, Ordinary Citizens.  Mikhail Frinovsky was shot and executed by firing squad on 4 February, 1940.

Awards
 Order of Lenin (February 14, 1936)

 three orders of the Red Banner (1924, 20.12.1932, 3.02.1935)

 Order of the Red Star (July 22, 1937)

 medal "XX years of the RSCA" (February 22, 1938)

 Order of the Red Banner of the Mongolian People's Republic (October 25, 1937)

 Order of the Red Banner of Labor of the Azerbaijan SSR (March 4, 1931)

 Order of the Red Banner of Labor of the ZRFSR (March 7, 1932)

 Badge "Honorary Worker of the Cheka-OGPU (V)" (1925)

 Badge "Honorary Worker of the Cheka-OGPU (XV)" (May 26, 1933)

Decree of the Presidium of the Supreme Soviet of the USSR of January 24, 1941 deprived of state awards and military rank.

Family
 Brother – Frinovsky Georgy Petrovich (1908–1942) – from January 1937 he served as chief of staff, from October 7, 1937 commander of the 225th escort regiment; supervised the escort of prisoners of the Solovetsky Special Purpose Camp to the places of execution, major of state security.

 Wife – Frinovskaya Nina Stepanovna (1903, Ryazan – February 3, 1940) - Russian, non-partisan, higher education, graduate student of the Institute of History of the USSR Academy of Sciences. Arrested April 12, 1939. February 2, 1940 on charges of "concealing the criminal counter-revolutionary activities of enemies of the people" (that is, her own husband and son), the Military Collegium of the Supreme Court of the USSR was sentenced to death. Shot on February 3, 1940. Rehabilitated by the Plenum of the Supreme Court of the USSR on January 12, 1966.

 Son – Frinovsky Oleg Mikhailovich (1922, Kharkov – January 21, 1940, Moscow) – member of the Komsomol, unfinished secondary education, student of the 10th grade of the 2nd Moscow special artillery school. Arrested April 12, 1939. On January 21, 1940, he was sentenced to death by the Military Collegium of the Supreme Court of the USSR on charges of participating in a "counter-revolutionary youth group". Shot on the same day. Rehabilitated by the Plenum of the Supreme Court of the USSR on January 12, 1966.

In Moscow, Frinovsky occupied a 9-room apartment (Kropotkinskaya street, building 31, apt. 77), in which, after his arrest, the family of a high-ranking NKVD officer, Veniamin Gulst, moved in.

See also
Commanders of the border troops USSR and RF

References

1898 births
1940 deaths
Cheka officers
NKVD officers
People from Penza Oblast
People from Narovchatsky Uyezd
Bolsheviks
Communist Party of the Soviet Union members
First convocation members of the Supreme Soviet of the Soviet Union
Russian military personnel of World War I
Soviet military personnel of the Russian Civil War
Great Purge perpetrators
Recipients of the Order of Lenin
Recipients of the Order of the Red Banner
Great Purge victims from Russia